Ibrahim Ssemujju Nganda, commonly known as Ibrahim Ssemujju, is a Ugandan journalist and politician. He is the member of Parliament representing Kira municipality in the 10th Parliament (2016 to 2021).

Background and education
Ssemujju was born in Bijaaba Village, Kyazanga Municipality, Lwengo District, on 23 September 1973. At that time, Lwengo District was still part of Masaka District. He is the son of Hajji Ali Nganda Nkwanga and Hajati Sophia Nalwooga, one of his forty-eight children and one of her sixteen offspring.

He attended the Bijaaba Islamic Institute, "a few meters from his birthplace", obtaining the Primary Leaving Certificate while there. After the institute started a secondary school section, Ssemujju joined. However, by Senior 2, most of his female classmates had found husbands and dropped out, while his male cohorts left for odd jobs in nearby Masaka Town. He raised whatever little capital he could and convinced his father to enroll him in Masaka Secondary School for his Senior 3 studies. At that time, he barely spoke any English, but they admitted him anyway.

He progressively did well and passed his O-Level examinations in 1992. He went on to pursue his A-Level education, also at Masaka Secondary School. He graduated at the top of his class in 1995. He was admitted to Makerere University, on a full Ugandan government scholarship to study mass communication. He graduated in 1998 with a Bachelor of Arts mass communication.

Career
Straight out of Makerere, he was hired as a reporter for the Daily Monitor, one of the two leading English language daily newspapers in Uganda, serving in that role until 2004. His beat was coverage of the Ugandan parliament. From 2000 until 2001, he taught journalism at the Islamic University in Uganda. In 2004, he left the Daily Monitor to join The Observer, both as a reporter and as a shareholder. He was assigned the role of political editor at the Weekly Observer, serving in that role until 2011. In 2009, he was assigned additional duties as the editor, educational news. In 2011, he resigned from his journalism assignments to contest the parliamentary seat of Kyaddondo County East. He ran on the Forum for Democratic Change (FDC) political party platform. He won and is the current incumbent. Prior to the February 2016 presidential, parliamentary, and local elections, Kira Municipality was awarded a parliamentary seat, separate from Kyaddondo East. Ssemujju is contesting for that seat under the FDC political party banner.

Other considerations
In parliament, he chairs the Committee on Commissions, Statutory Authorities and State Enterprises. He is also a member of the Committee on Defence and Internal Affairs and of the Business Committee. He is married to Faridah Ssemujju, and together are the parents of three daughters and three sons.

References

External links
Website of the Parliament of Uganda
MP Ssemujju Nganda Violently Arrested – 19 October 2012
Ssekandi Hails Churches for Social, Spiritual Development

Living people
Makerere University alumni
Ugandan journalists
People from Lwengo District
Ganda people
1973 births
Forum for Democratic Change politicians
Members of the Parliament of Uganda
Ugandan Muslims
Academic staff of the Islamic University in Uganda
21st-century Ugandan politicians